is a Japanese video game producer and former sound producer and composer. He joined Capcom in 1998, where he acted as producer on the Street Fighter franchise up to Street Fighter V. He was the studio director of Capcom Vancouver, the developer of Dead Rising series, from 2011 to 2014.

On August 9, 2020, Ono announced on his Twitter account that he left Capcom in summer 2020. Since Aniplex acquires Delightworks' game division as of December 12, 2021, Ono and other employees at the said division moved to its successor under Aniplex' subsidiary company name, Lasengle as of early 2022.

Games

Capcom

Delightworks

Filmography 

 Street Fighter: Assassin's Fist (2014) - Ono

References

External links
Yoshinori Ono on MobyGames

Chief operating officers
Living people
Japanese video game producers
Street Fighter
Year of birth missing (living people)
Video game businesspeople